In economics, resource allocation is the assignment of available resources to various uses. In the context of an entire economy, resources can be allocated by various means, such as markets, or planning.

In project management, resource allocation or resource management is the scheduling of activities and the resources required by those activities while taking into consideration both the resource availability and the project time.

Economics

In economics, the field of public finance deals with three broad areas: macroeconomic stabilization, the distribution of income and wealth, and the allocation of resources. Much of the study of the allocation of resources is devoted to finding the conditions under which particular mechanisms of resource allocation lead to Pareto efficient outcomes, in which no party's situation can be improved without hurting that of another party.

Strategic planning
In strategic planning, resource allocation is a plan for using available resources,  for example human resources, especially in the near term, to achieve goals for the future. It is the process of allocating scarce resources among the various projects or business units.

There are a number of approaches to solving resource allocation problems e.g. resources can be allocated using a manual approach, an algorithmic approach (see below), or a combination of both.

There may be contingency mechanisms such as a priority ranking of items excluded from the plan, showing which items to fund if more resources should become available and a priority ranking of some items included in the plan, showing which items should be sacrificed if total funding must be reduced.

Algorithms
Resource allocation may be decided by using computer programs applied to a specific domain to automatically and dynamically distribute resources to applicants.

This is especially common in electronic devices dedicated to routing and communication. For example, channel allocation in wireless communication may be decided by a base transceiver station using an appropriate algorithm.

One class of resource whereby applicants bid for the best resource(s) according to their balance of "money", as in an online auction business model (see also auction theory).

In one paper on CPU time slice allocation
an auction algorithm is compared to proportional share scheduling.

See also

Corruption

Fair division

References

Resources
Strategic management
Schedule (project management)
Economic planning
Public finance
Contexts for auctions